Edward John Kumwembe  famously known as Edo Kumwembe is a Tanzanian journalist sports writer and a football commentator at  Wasafi Media. He is a pundit for   SuperSport TV in South Africa doing football commentary in Swahili language since August 2016.
He doubles as a host for  a sports talk show on Wasafi FM and  a  sports columnist  for  Mwanaspoti a Swahili sports newspaper published by Mwananchi Communications Limited in Tanzania.

Early life and career
Edo was born on April 16, 1977, in Dar es Salaam. In October 2019, he  joined Wasafi FM as a Host for a sports talk show as well he is a  sports writer at Mwanaspoti ; a Kiswahili sports newspaper in Tanzania  which is under  Mwananchi Communications Limited.
Since August 2016, he serves as a pundit for  Supersport in South Africa where he is part of the team that presents Swahili  commentary on the English Premier League, World Cup and the African Cup of Nations.
He has covered top competitions such as the African Cup of Nations  in Ghana 2008, The Confederations Cup 2009 in South Africa, World Cup 2014 in Brazil, as well several league games in Europe including the UEFA Champions League.

References

External links 

Tanzanian journalists
Mass media in Tanzania
Africa-focused media
African journalists
Living people
Year of birth missing (living people)